In Greek mythology, Euryleon (Ancient Greek: Εύρυλέοντα) was one of the comrades of the Greek hero Odysseus.

Mythology 
When Odysseus and 12 of his crew came into the port of Sicily, the Cyclops Polyphemus seized and confined them. The monster then slain Euryleon and five others namely: Antiphon, Apheidas, Kepheus, Stratios and Menetos, while the remaining six survived.

Notes

Reference 

 Tzetzes, John, Allegories of the Odyssey translated by Goldwyn, Adam J. and Kokkini, Dimitra. Dumbarton Oaks Medieval Library, Harvard University Press, 2015. 

Characters in Greek mythology